Tagarades is a village and a community of the Thermi municipality. Before the 2011 local government reform it was part of the municipality of Thermi, of which it was a municipal district. The 2011 census recorded 2,088 inhabitants in the village. The community of Tagarades covers an area of 15.325 km2.

See also
 List of settlements in the Thessaloniki regional unit

References

Populated places in Thessaloniki (regional unit)